The 1994–95 Coppa Italia was the 48th edition of the tournament. The final was contested between Juventus and Parma, who also met in the previous month in the 1995 UEFA Cup Final. Juventus won 3–0 on aggregate.

First round 

p=after penalty shoot-out

Second round 

p=after penalty shoot-out

Third round

Quarter-finals

Semi-finals

Final

First leg

Second leg

Juventus won 3–0 on aggregate.

Top goalscorers

References
Italy - Coppa Italia History rsssf.com
Coppa Italia 1994/95 at rsssf.com

Coppa Italia seasons
Coppa Italia, 1994-95
Coppa Italia, 1994-95